André Felipe de Sousa Galiassi (22 August 1980 in São Paulo) is a Brazilian retired footballer that played as a centre back.

Career 
He is both a champion of Bolivia and Romania. Galiassi played his first match in Liga I on 24 February 2007 and managed to score one goal, which is not a common occurrence among foreign debutants in Liga 1. After his consistent performances in the UEFA Champions League there appeared rumours about a possible transfer to the Russian Premier League or Super League Greece.

Personal life
André is married and has one daughter. He is an adept of Neopenticostalism, describing him as a religious person. He also says that he would like to become a priest after finishing the football career.
Unlike most football players, he prefers to hang out with family and friends in his spare time, instead of going to clubs.

Honours

Player
Club Bolívar
Bolivian Primera División: 2005–06 Clausura
CFR Cluj
Liga I: 2007–08
Cupa României: 2007–08, 2008–09

References

External links

André Galiassi at BDFA.com.ar 

1980 births
Living people
Brazilian footballers
Brazilian expatriate footballers
Association football defenders
Club Bolívar players
CFR Cluj players
Kasımpaşa S.K. footballers
CSM Unirea Alba Iulia players
CS Concordia Chiajna players
Expatriate footballers in Romania
Expatriate footballers in Turkey
Liga I players
Süper Lig players
Footballers from São Paulo